James Patrick Mahon (born 19 July 1990) is an Irish TV news reporter and lecturer.

Early life
Mahon attended secondary school at Gort Community School, before attending university where he received a B.A in English and Classics and a Diploma in Irish from the National University of Ireland, Galway (NUIG).

He was later a student at the University of Sheffield where he undertook a masters in broadcast journalism.

Journalism
Mahon was a blogger based between the UK and Ireland discussing the areas of current affairs and sport. He also contributed to a Newcastle United football blog, and was a former UK football editor for Spanish sports magazine Vavel. He was an online host for Forge TV in Sheffield and presented a radio show on Redroad FM in Rotherham.

Mahon's work has appeared on the Huffington Post, CNN i-report, Allvoices.com, Digitaljournal.com, TheChesterfieldPost.co.uk, and IrishCentral.com.

Moving to the US in 2012, he spent time at East Tennessee PBS in Knoxville, before moving to CBS affiliate WDEF-TV News 12 in Chattanooga, Tennessee. He hosted a lifestyle series called "Through Irish Eyes" and was a general assignment reporter from 2012 to 2015.

In late 2015 Mahon returned to Europe, and worked as a freelance radio and TV reporter for regional and national outlets including RTÉ, WJXT, RTÉ Raidió na Gaeltachta and Rudaw Media Network. In 2016 and 2017 he presented and produced The Impact for Irish TV.

As of 2021, Mahon was a contributing reporter for UTV Live in Belfast and ITV Border in Scotland.

Academia
In 2016 Mahon became a journalism lecturer at the University of the West of Scotland. 

He wrote a book about "Irish millennial emigrant"s titled Through Irish Eyes, and has also written about "media manipulation and happiness".

In 2021 he graduated as one of the first doctors in mobile journalism.

Recognition
 Award of Merit: “Record-Breaking Bust,” Deadline/Breaking News Reporting, television  Society of Professional Journalism, 2014 
 Honorable Mention- Society of Professional Journalism, Feature Reporting, 2015.
 Associated Press "Political Coverage" Tennessee, 2nd Place, 2018 
 Crown Wood International Film Festival "Best Mobile Film", The Mojo Revolution, 2019 
 L'Age d'Or International Art-house Film Festival, "Outstanding Achievement Award", 2019, A Global Mobile Journalism Journey,
 Virgin Spring Cinefest, "Best Mobile Film", A Global Mobile Journalism Journey, 2019, 
 African Smartphone International Film Festival, "BEST DOCUMENTARY INTERNATIONAL", The Mojo Revolution News, 2019, 
 White Unicorn International Film Festival, "Winner, Mobile Film", A Global Mobile Journalism Journey, 2019, 
 The International Film and Television Festival SIMFEST, "Winner, Investigation Journalism", A Global Mobile Journalism Journey, 2020,

References

1990 births
Living people
Alumni of the University of Galway
Irish bloggers
Irish journalists
Romanian emigrants to Ireland
British radio DJs